In folkloristics, folk belief or folk-belief is a broad genre of folklore that is often expressed in narratives, customs, rituals, foodways, proverbs, and rhymes. It also includes a wide variety of behaviors, expressions, and beliefs. Examples of concepts included in this genre are magic, popular belief, folk religion, planting signs, hoodoo, conjuration, charms, root work, taboos, old wives' tales, omens, portents, the supernatural and folk medicine.

Folk belief and associated behaviors are strongly evidenced among all elements of society, regardless of education level or income. In turn, folk belief is found in an agricultural, suburban, and urban environments alike.

Terminology
One of a variety of compounds extending from the coinage of the term folklore in 1846 (previously popular antiquities), the term folk-belief is first evidenced in use by British folklorist Laurence Gomme in 1892.

Common parlance employs the word superstition for what folklorists generally refer to as folk belief.

Notes

References
 Georges, Robert A. & Jones, Michael Owen. 1995. Folkloristics: An Introduction. Indiana University Press. .
 Green, Thomas A. 1997. Folklore: An Encyclopedia of Beliefs, Customs, Tales, Music, and Art. Vol. 1. ABC-CLIO.

Belief
Belief
Folklore studies